Horncastle Town F.C. is an English association football club from Horncastle in Lincolnshire.

History
The first team from the town, simply called Horncastle, and playing "on the Wong", was founded in 1866, and played in an all-white kit with blue facings, belt, socks, and a gold-tasselled cap.  It seems to have become defunct in 1873.

FA Cup main rounds

The club first entered the FA Cup in 1885-86.  The club was drawn to place Middlesbrough in the first round, with Boro having choice of ground, which they exercised in favour of them having the tie at home.  Horncastle suggested playing in Sheffield, because of the cost in transport, which Boro refused; Horncastle therefore withdrew.

In 1886-87 however the club went on its best-ever Cup run.  In the first round, the club beat Darlington in the first round before 2,000 spectators; the Lincolnshire Chronicle stated the match was "the very best‐bar none‐we have ever witnessed on the Wong", whereas the Northern Echo, bemoaning two disallowed Darlington goals and complaining the first Town goal had cleared the bar, stated The game was of avery rough character, and did not excite much interest.”

The club got a bye in the second round and beat Grantham Town at home in the third, but lost away to Aston Villa in the fourth.

The next year was the last in which clubs had automatic entry rights to the first round, and the club was drawn to play Lincoln City away; the match was considered a "foregone conclusion" and the Cits duly won 4-1.

Later history

The club did not turn professional and reverted to the minor leagues, its most prominent league success being champions of the Lincoln League in 1979-80.  The club had a banner year in 1926-27, winning eight knockout trophies.  It has been a constant member of the Lincolnshire League since joining in 1996.

Colours

Town's original colours were cerise and French grey, changed in 1886 to Lincoln green with a gridiron badge.  In the 1990s the club changed to the town's corporate colours of red and white.

Honours 

Lincoln League

 Winners: 1979-80

Lincolnshire County Senior B Cup

 Winners: 2004-05

Hotchkin Cup

 Winners: 1979-80, 1980-81

Willoughby Cup

 Winners: 1949-50

References

Football clubs in England
Association football clubs established in the 19th century
Football clubs in Lincolnshire